Robert Martin Groves (born September 27, 1948) is an American sociologist and expert in survey methodology who has served as the Provost of Georgetown University in Washington, D.C. since August 2012. He also served as the Director of the United States Census Bureau from 2009 to 2012.

Early life
Groves was born in Kansas City, Missouri, grew up in Metairie, Louisiana, and graduated in 1966 from De La Salle High School in New Orleans.

Education 
In 1970, Groves graduated (summa cum laude, Phi Beta Kappa) from Dartmouth College with an A.B. degree in sociology. He later earned two M.A. degrees (sociology and statistics, both 1973) and a PhD (sociology, 1975) from the University of Michigan.

Academic career
For much of his career, starting in 1975, Groves worked as a research professor in survey methodology at the University of Michigan. He was also a researcher in the Joint Program in Survey Methodology, housed at the University of Maryland, College Park. In August 2012, he became the Provost of Georgetown University, succeeding James J. O'Donnell.

In 1982 Groves was elected as a Fellow of the American Statistical Association.
He was elected to the National Academy of Sciences in 2011 and is a fellow of the American Academy of Arts and Sciences.

Government career
When Groves was an associate director at the United States Census Bureau in the early 1990s, he argued that potentially millions of minorities who typically voted Democratic were being undercounted. Groves advocated for the use of statistical adjustments to account for this discrepancy. George H. W. Bush's Commerce Secretary Robert Mosbacher blocked this suggestion. The Census Bureau is a component of the U.S. Department of Commerce.

On April 2, 2009, Groves was nominated by President Barack Obama to head the Census Bureau.  During his confirmation hearings, Republican senators raised concerns based on Groves' previous actions that he would apply statistical adjustments to populations believed to be undercounted, thereby inflating their numbers and affecting the apportionment of congressional seats.  Groves ruled out the use of statistical adjustments during the hearings and his nomination quickly proceeded to the full Senate in May.  However, senators Richard Shelby and David Vitter continued to delay his confirmation due to lingering worries regarding statistical adjustments.  They also sought assurance from the Obama administration that the controversial community group ACORN would not be involved in grassroots outreach related to the 2010 Census.  On July 13, 2009, after several weeks of opposition by the two senators, Senate majority leader Harry Reid used a procedural motion to force a vote that confirmed Groves, 76-15.  He took office July 15, 2009.

On June 13, 2014, President Obama announced his appointment of Groves to the National Science Board of the National Science Foundation.

Publishing history
Groves is the author of several books, including:
 Surveying Victims (2008) 
 Survey Errors and Survey Costs (2004) 
 Survey Methodology (2010) Second edition of the (2004) first edition 
 Survey Nonresponse (2001) 
 Nonresponse in Household Interview Surveys (1998) 

Groves is the editor of several books, including:
 Measurement Errors in Surveys (2004) 
 Telephone Survey Methodology (2001)

References

External links

1948 births
Directors of the United States Census Bureau
American sociologists
American statisticians
American male writers
Dartmouth College alumni
Living people
Obama administration personnel
Survey methodologists
United States Census Bureau people
University of Maryland, College Park faculty
University of Michigan alumni
University of Michigan faculty
Fellows of the American Statistical Association
Members of the United States National Academy of Sciences
Georgetown University faculty